Carmen Fantasy may refer to:

Carmen Fantasy (Sarasate)
Carmen Fantasie (Waxman)